BenQ-Siemens P51 is a Windows Mobile 5.0 PDA smartphone developed by BenQ Mobile. It comes with an array of wireless connectivity including a built-in GPS receiver, Bluetooth and Wi-Fi. Like the BenQ P50 before it, the P51 took long to market - it was announced in March 2006 but was only first available in November 2006 in China, and March 2007 in Singapore and Turkey.

The next BenQ Windows Mobile device platform would be the BenQ E72 is the bar form factor without touch screen, had run on Windows Mobile 6.1 Standards (Smartphone Edition). its been released on 2010.

Specification sheet

References 

 BenQ-Siemens P51 specifications
 BenQ-Siemens P51 User Guide

BenQ mobile phones
Siemens mobile phones